Tail Spin (also known as Tailspin) is a 1939 aviation film.  The screenplay was written by Frank Wead and directed by Roy Del Ruth. It was based on the book, "Women with Wings: A novel of the modern day aviatrix" (Ganesha Publishing, 1935), authored by Genevieve Haugen, who was also an advisor and stunt pilot in the film. Tail  Spin starred Alice Faye, Constance Bennett, Nancy Kelly, Joan Davis, Charles Farrell and Jane Wyman.

Plot

Trixie Lee (Alice Faye) takes a leave of absence from her job as a Hollywood hat-check girl to pursue her career as an aviatrix. She and partner Babe Dugan (Joan Davis) enter an air race from Los Angeles to Cleveland, but an oil leak causes their aircraft to crash.

Navy flyer Tex Price (Kane Richmond) helps with their engine. Meanwhile, steel mogul T.P. Lester (Harry Davenport) indulges the ambition of his daughter Gerry (Constance Bennett) to fly in the Powder Puff national race. Gerry is also Tex's ex.

Trixie wants to win both Tex and the race, so she and Babe do everything they can to discourage Gerry or sabotage her chances. In the sky during the Powder Puff race, the superior aircraft Gerry owns is winning, but she pretends to have engine failure so Trixie can win.

Knowing that she misjudged Gerry all along, Trixie steps aside as Tex and Gerry get back together.

Cast

 Alice Faye as Trixie Lee
 Constance Bennett as Gerry Lester
 Nancy Kelly as Lois Allen
 Joan Davis as Babe Dugan
 Charles Farrell as Bud
 Jane Wyman as Alabama
 Kane Richmond as Lt. Dick "Tex" Price
 Wally Vernon as Chick
 Joan Valerie as Sunny
 Edward Norris as Speed Allen
 J. Anthony Hughes as Al Moore
 Harry Davenport as T. P. Lester
 Mary Gordon as Mrs. Lee
 Adrian Morris as Repo Man

Production
Tail Spin centered on the "Powder Puff Derby" that was part of the 1939 Cleveland Air Races. Some of the crashes in the race were incorporated in the production. The aerial photography was directed by noted Hollywood film pilot Paul Mantz.

Reception
In order to publicize Tail Spin, the studio sent a bevy of starlets that accompanied a group of women flyers on a tour of 25 key cities. In his review for The New York Times, Frank S. Nugent saw a winning formula, "... thoroughly competent job of movie-making. It is constructed on a simple formula: every time the picture is about to crash, Mr. Zanuck crashes a couple of planes instead. And, though in retrospect the story seems to be strewn with the wreckage from these artistic emergencies, what possible solution to any dramatic imbroglio could be quicker and cleaner to the participants, more exciting or more spectacular to the onlookers than a good old-fashioned airplane crash?" He also knew that the attraction of women pilots would be a hit with audiences.

Film critic Leonard Maltin's later review was more critical, "Hackneyed saga of female flyers, with Faye (in a change-of-pace role) having to scrounge for pennies and face competition from socialite/aviatrix Bennett. Written by Frank "Spig" Wead."

References

Notes

Bibliography

 Pendo, Stephen. Aviation in the Cinema. Lanham, Maryland: Scarecrow Press, 1985. .

External links
 
 
 
 

1939 films
American aviation films
American black-and-white films
1930s English-language films
Films directed by Roy Del Ruth
20th Century Fox films
1939 drama films
American drama films
Films produced by Darryl F. Zanuck
Films scored by Louis Silvers
1930s American films